Oscar Merril Hartzell (1876–1943) was an American con man who ran a confidence scam by claiming rightful ownership of the estate of Sir Francis Drake. In total, Hartzell swindled at least $2 million, from 70,000 to 80,000 people.

Early life

Hartzell was born in 1876 in Monmouth, Illinois. He worked on his family's farm, eventually inheriting it from his father in 1905. Due to difficulties running the farm, Hartzell fell into financial trouble. He moved to Des Moines, Iowa, where he worked as a realtor, and then as a deputy sheriff. According to Hartzell, in 1915 he met con artists Sudie Whiteaker and Milo Lewis, who promised to turn his mother's $6,000 into $6 million by giving him a share of the held fortune of Sir Francis Drake. When Hartzell realized the deal was a confidence game, he decided to use it to his own advantage, and joined in.

Sir Francis Drake estate scam

Hartzell contacted many Iowans who had the surname Drake. He claimed he was a distant relative and had discovered that the estate of Sir Francis Drake had never been paid to his heirs, that it had gathered interest for the last 300 years and was now worth $100 billion. Hartzell invited all these families to invest in his campaign to sue the British government for the money and assured them that everyone would make $500 for every dollar they invested. The inheritance would include the whole city of Plymouth in England.

Tens of thousands of Americans sponsored him, sometimes with all the money they had. Hartzell later expanded his con to people without the surname Drake and outside of Iowa.

Around 1917, Hartzell travelled to London in order to meet with the heir of the Drake estate. He ended up staying, and lived an opulent lifestyle. He continued to tell the families who had invested in the "campaign" that he was negotiating with the British government and needed even more money for expenses. His agents in the Midwest, some of whom believed in the scheme themselves, collected the money.

On August 9, 1922, the British Home Office informed the American embassy that there was no unclaimed Sir Francis Drake estate. Hartzell explained that the estate was not unclaimed because it belonged to Drexel Drake (a nonexistent colonel) and therefore to Hartzell.

Since  Hartzell had not broken any British laws the British police could not arrest him. The FBI investigated and announced that Drake's wife had duly inherited his estate in 1597. That information did not stop the donations. When Ed Smith, Iowa Secretary of State, tried to convince the state legislature to act, the public and Hartzell's supporters protested, saying they could donate to whomever they wanted so the legislature did nothing.

After the Wall Street Crash of 1929 and during the Great Depression, Hartzell's followers seemed to become even more desperate and continued to send him money.

On October 11, 1930, John Maynard Keynes, arguing in an article for deficit spending to alleviate the Depression, mentioned that Queen Elizabeth had invested Drake's loot—which Drake had given to the crown—for the benefit of the country. Hartzell seized this as a proof of his claims and his agents in the USA spread copies of the article to his followers.

Eventually United States Postal Service inspector John Sparks, with help from the British police, seized some of Hartzell's agents and forced them to reveal the scam. At the same time, Scotland Yard arrested some of Hartzell's British associates. Britain deported Hartzell to USA and he was sent to Iowa for trial in 1933. By this time, according to U.S. officials, Hartzell had collected $800,000 from the scam.

Hartzell was tried in Sioux City, Iowa in 1933. His followers sent him a total of $68,000 for his defence. He was convicted of fraud in November 1933, sentenced to ten years in prison, and fined $2,000. By that time, he had run his scam for over 15 years. He was sent to Leavenworth Penitentiary.  Even after his sentencing, some of his agents collected more donations—$500,000 for the next year.

Hartzell was eventually judged to be insane, and was transferred to the Medical Center for Federal Prisoners. He died there in 1943.

Books

References

1876 births
1943 deaths
American confidence tricksters
People from Madison County, Iowa
Impostors
Hoaxes in the United States
American people who died in prison custody
Prisoners who died in United States federal government detention
American people convicted of fraud
1910s hoaxes